Dmitrij Gerasimenko (born 1 October 1987 in Zlatoust, Soviet Union) is a Serbian judoka and sambo competitor of Russian origin.

Career 
He won 2 medals at the 2009 Summer Universiade for Russia.

In 2011, he changed nationality and started to compete for Serbia. He won several medals for Serbia in international competitions. At the 2012 European Judo Championships he won 7th place and secured participation at the 2012 Olympic Games.  At the 2012 Summer Olympics, he competed in the -90 kg category, beating Roméo Koné Kinapéya in the first round before losing to eventual silver medalist Asley González in the second.

References

External links 
 JudoInside
 Dmitri Gerasimenko biography and Olympic results at Sports-reference.com

1987 births
Living people
Olympic judoka of Serbia
Serbian male judoka
Russian male judoka
Judoka at the 2012 Summer Olympics
Serbian sambo practitioners
Serbian people of Russian descent
Serbian people of Ukrainian descent
Universiade medalists in judo
Universiade gold medalists for Russia
Universiade silver medalists for Russia
Universiade bronze medalists for Russia
Judoka at the 2015 European Games
Sambo practitioners at the 2019 European Games
European Games medalists in sambo
European Games bronze medalists for Serbia
Medalists at the 2007 Summer Universiade
Medalists at the 2009 Summer Universiade
Naturalized citizens of Serbia
People from Zlatoust
Sportspeople from Chelyabinsk Oblast